Mark Kilam is a professional Canadian football coach who is currently the special teams coordinator ad assistant head coach for the Calgary Stampeders of the Canadian Football League (CFL). He is a three-time Grey Cup champion as an assistant coach with the Stampeders, having won in 2008, 2014, and 2018.

Early life
Kilam was born to parents Surender and Jan, both of whom are doctors. He grew up in Lethbridge, Alberta where he attended Lethbridge Collegiate Institute.

University career
Kilam played CIAU football as a linebacker for the Alberta Golden Bears from 1997 to 2001.

Coaching career

Early career
Kilam began his coaching career as a defensive assistant coach for the Cochrane High School Cobras from 2002 to 2005 where the team won three provincial high school championships. He also coached for the Southern Alberta All-Star Team in the Provincial Senior Bowl from 2003 to 2005.

Calgary Stampeders
Kilam was hired by the Calgary Stampeders for the 2005 season as the strength and conditioning coach. In 2006, he also added the title of defensive quality control coach. In the following season, he was promoted to linebackers coach and served in that capacity for three years. He won his first Grey Cup championship when the Stampeders defeated the Montreal Alouettes in the 96th Grey Cup game in 2008.

On December 8, 2009, Kilam was promoted to special teams coordinator for the Stampeders. He won his first Grey Cup as a coordinator following the team's 102nd Grey Cup victory over the Hamilton Tiger-Cats in 2014. He won his third Grey Cup when the Stampeders won the 106th Grey Cup in 2018. In 2019, Kilam was given the title of assistant head coach, in addition to his special teams duties.

Personal life
Kilam and his wife, Andrea, have two daughters. He is on the board of directors for the Lethbridge Vipers in their bid to join the Canadian Junior Football League.

References

External links
 Calgary Stampeders profile

Living people
Alberta Golden Bears football players
Calgary Stampeders coaches
Canadian football linebackers
Players of Canadian football from Alberta
Sportspeople from Lethbridge
Year of birth missing (living people)